Ashok Sharma is an Indian politician. He was elected to the Lok Sabha, the lower house of the Parliament of India from Rajnandgaon, Madhya Pradesh as a member of the Bharatiya Janata Party.

References

External links
 Official biographical sketch on the Parliament of India website

1950 births
Living people
Bharatiya Janata Party politicians from Chhattisgarh
Lok Sabha members from Madhya Pradesh
India MPs 1996–1997
Bharatiya Janata Party politicians from Madhya Pradesh